The University of Tehran (Tehran University or UT) is the oldest and most prominent Iranian university located in Tehran, Iran. Based on its historical, socio-cultural, and political pedigree, as well as its research and teaching profile, UT has been nicknamed "The Mother University [of Iran]". In international rankings, UT has been ranked as one of the best universities in the Middle East and is among the top universities of the world. It is also the premier knowledge producing institute among all OIC countries. Tehran University of Medical Sciences is in the 7th ranking of the Islamic World University Ranking in 2021. The university offers more than 111 bachelor's degree programs, 177 master's degree programs, and 156 PhD. programs. Many of the departments were absorbed into the University of Tehran from the Dar al-Funun established in 1851 and the Tehran School of Political Sciences established in 1899.

The main campus of the university is located in the central part of the city. However, other campuses are spread across the city as well as in the suburbs such as the Baghe Negarestan Campus at the central eastern part of the city, the Northern Amirabad Campuses at the central western part of the city and the Abureyhan Campus in the suburb of the capital. The main gate of the university with its specific design and modern architecture (at Enghelab Street at the main campus) is the logo of the university and in a more general sense, a logo of education in Iran. The university is one of the city's attractions, hosting many international and cultural events attracting academia, foreign tourists as well as local residents. The major festive of Friday Prayers of the capital is held at the university's main campus every Friday.

Admission to the university's renowned undergraduate and graduate programs is very competitive and is limited to the top one percent of students who pass the national entrance examination administered yearly by the Ministry of Science, Research and Technology.

History

The first official step for the establishment of the present form of University of Tehran in Iran occurred on 31 March 1931 when Minister of Court Abdolhossein Teymourtash wrote Isa Sedigh who was completing his doctoral dissertation at Columbia University in New York to inquire as to requirements for the establishment of a university in Tehran. Isa Sedigh regarded the letter as an invitation to outline a comprehensive scheme for the establishment of a new university.

In January 1933, during the cabinet meeting, the subject was brought up. Ali Asghar Hekmat, the acting minister of the Ministry of Education stated the following words there:
"Of course, there is no doubt on the thriving state and the glory of the capital, but the only obvious deficiency is that this city has no 'university'. It is a pity that this city lags far behind other great countries of the world."
His words had a profound impact on everyone in the meeting, resulting in the acceptance of the proposal. Thus allocating an initial budget of 250,000 Tomans, the Ministry of Education was authorized to find a suitable land for the establishment of the university and take necessary measures to construct the building as soon as possible.
Ali Asghar Hekmat in collaboration and consultation with André Godard, a French skillful architect – who was serving the Ministry of Education as an engineer, promptly began looking for a suitable location for the university grounds. By the orders of Rezā Shāh, the compound of Jalaliyeh garden was selected. Jalaliyeh garden was located in the north of the then Tehran between Amirabad village and the northern trench of Tehran. This beautiful garden, full of orchards was founded in the early 1900s during the final years of Nasir ad- Din Shah, by the order of Prince Jalal ad-dawlah.
The master plan of the campus buildings was drawn up by French architects Roland Dubrulle and Maxime Siroux, Swiss architect Alexandre Moser, as well as Andre Godard, Nicolai Markov and Mohsen Foroughi. The influences of early 20th century modernist architecture are today readily visible on the main campus grounds of the university.
The University of Tehran officially inaugurated in 1934. The Amir-abad (North Karegar) campus was added in 1945 after American troops left the property as World War II was coming to an end.
The university admitted women as students for the first time in 1937.

In 1935, the formerly males-only university opened its doors to women as part of the country's sweeping universal education policy.

In 1986, the Iranian parliament, known as the Majlis of Iran, stipulated that the university's overcrowded College of Medicine be separated into the independent Tehran University of Medical Sciences (TUMS), and that TUMS be placed under the leadership of the new ministry of health and Medical Education. With over 13,000 current students, TUMS remains the best medical school in Iran.

Campuses, colleges and faculties

1. Regional Campuses:
 Aras International Campus
 Caspian International Campus
 Persian Gulf International Campus
 Kish International Campus
 Alborz Campus

2. Colleges:
College of Engineering
Schools & Faculties:
School of Electrical & Computer Engineering
School of Mechanical Engineering
School of Chemical Engineering
School of Metallurgy & Materials Engineering
School of Civil Engineering
School of Mining Engineering
School of Surveying and Geomatics Engineering
School of Industrial Engineering
School of Engineering Science
Fouman Faculty of Engineering in Fouman
Caspian Faculty of Engineering in Rezvanshahr
College of Science
Schools:
School of Mathematics, Statistics and Computer Science
School of Geology
School of Biology
School of Chemistry
School of Physics
School of Biotechnology

College of Fine Arts
College of Agriculture & Natural Resources in Karaj and Pakdasht
College of Farabi in Qom

3. Faculties
Faculty of New Sciences and Technologies
Faculty of Veterinary Medicine
Faculty of Governance

Humanities Faculties:

Faculty of World Studies
Faculty of Foreign Languages and Literature
Faculty of Literature and Human Sciences
Faculty of Law and Political Science
Faculty of Theology and Islamic Studies
Faculty of Thought and Islamic Sciences

Social and Behavioral Sciences Faculties:
Faculty of Economics
Faculty of Physical Education and Sport Sciences
Faculty of Geography
Faculty of Psychology and Education
Faculty of Social Sciences
Faculty of Entrepreneurship
Faculty of Management

Academic institutes and centers

University of Tehran also co-ordinates several major institutes:
 Institute of Biochemistry and Biophysics
 Institute of Geophysics
 The International Research Center for Coexistence with Deserts
 Institute of History of Science 
 Institute for North American and European Studies 
 Institute of Electrotechnic
 Center for Women's Studies 
 Applied Management Research Center
 Dehkhoda Dictionary Institute
 Vehicle, Fuel, and Environment Research Institute
 Turbo Machine Institute
 Institute of Petroleum Engineering
 Water Institute
 The Research Institute of Energy Planning and Management
 The Engineering Optimization Research Group
 Biomaterial Research Institute
 Advanced Material Research Institute
 Inorganic Material Research Institute
 University of Tehran Research Institute (UTRI)
 Science and Technology Park of University of Tehran
International Desert Research Center (IDRC)

Research and facilities
The University of Tehran hosts many cultural and academic activities on the national and international levels. UT enjoys the cooperation of foreign countries in holding international conferences, seminars and workshops. In 2008, close to 1,000 UT professors and graduate students have taken part in international conferences with university funding. Furthermore, UT regularly hosts many delegations and professors from abroad.

University of Tehran is appointed as the Center of Excellence (قطب علمی) by Iran's Ministry of Science and Technology in the fields of "Evaluation and improvement of irrigation networks", "Breeding and Biotechnology of trees", "Farming, Grading and Biotechnology", "Applied Electromagnetic Systems", "Land Logistics", "Sustainable Urban Planning and Development", "Architectural Technology", "Biological Control of Pests and Plant Diseases", "Rural Studies and Planning", "High-Performance Materials", "Control and Intelligent Processing", "Sustainable Management of Watershed", "Applied Management of Fast Growing Wood Species", "Surveying and Disaster Management", "Engineering and Infrastructure Management", "Oil and Gas". This appointment is based on national standing based on research achievements and invested funding in the mentioned topics. Fifteen percent of the country's Centers of Excellence, as recognized by the government, are located at the University of Tehran, which along with more than 40 research centers ensure UT's commitment to research. Together, over 3,500 laboratories are active in these centers and in the faculties. In addition, the University of Tehran publishes more than 50 scientific journals, some of which have the ISI index.

The Central Library and Documentation Center of the University of Tehran has been a member of the International Federation of Library Associations and institutions (IFLA) since 1967. The Central Library is the largest academic library in Iran. The library complements the 35 specialized libraries based at different faculties, all with the aim of advancing the research goals of the university. Currently the Central Library and Documentation Center is offering its services to more than 65 thousand members. It hosts more than 5,000 users daily. The library offers its resources under 13 main collections (most of which have been donated by distinguished professors of the university). The manuscript collection of the University of Tehran includes over 17,000 volumes of manuscripts in Persian, Arabic and Turkish. The library also hosts a state of the art center for the preservation of manuscripts. 
The University of Tehran Press (UTP), which focuses on publishing academic books, has published over 5,000 books up until today, and currently publishes on average more than one book per day. UTP has over 96 distribution agents throughout the country as well as one in Afghanistan.

Endowment

University of Tehran is a public university and its funding is provided by the government of Iran. For the top ranks of the national university entrance exam, education is free in all public universities. The people with ranks below the normal capacity of the universities will be required to pay part or all of the tuition. In 2011 University of Tehran with an amount equivalent to 70 million dollars got the highest budget among all universities in Iran.

Emblems
The emblem of the University of Tehran, which was designed by Dr. Mohsen Moghadam, a late faculty member of the Faculty of Fine Arts, is based on an image, which can be found in the stucco relief and seals of the Sasanid period. In this case, it is a copy from a stucco relief discovered in the city of Ctesiphon.

The seal symbolized ownership. In the Sassanid period, these seals were used in stucco reliefs, coins, and silver utensils as a family symbol. Since the alphabet of Sasanid Pahlavi's script was used in these badges, they have the nature of a monogram as well.

The motif is placed between two eagle wings. One can also find these motifs in other images of this period, such as in royal crowns, particularly at the end of the Sasanid period. Crowns with these seals have been called "two-feather crowns" in The Shahnameh. The motif between the wings was made by combining Pahlavi scripts. Some scholars have tried to read these images. The script is in the form of "Afzoot" (Amrood), which means plentiful and increasing.

Colors
University of Tehran's official color is University of Tehran Blue (RGB: 29,160,196).

Main entrance

The University of Tehran main entrance was designed in 1965 by Korosh Farzami, one of the students of the faculty of Fine Arts of the University and built by Arme Construction Company.

The gates are depicted on the reverse of the Iranian 50,000 rials banknote.

Faculties History
Initially University of Tehran included eight colleges and faculties:
 Faculty of Theology and Islamic Studies
 College of Science (1934)
 Faculty of Letters and Humanities
 Faculty of Medicine (1934)
 Faculty of Pharmacy (1934)
 Faculty of Dentistry (1939)
 College of Engineering (Fanni) (1942)
 Faculty of Law and Political Science (1942)

Later more faculties were founded:
College of Fine Arts (1941)
 Faculty of Veterinary Medicine (1943)
 Faculty of Agriculture (1945)
 Faculty of Management (1954)
 Faculty of Education (1954)
 Faculty of Natural Resources (1963)
 Faculty of Economics (1970)
 Faculty of Social Sciences (~1972)
 Faculty of Environment (1975)
 Faculty of Foreign Languages (1989)
 Faculty of Physical education
 Faculty of Geography (~2002)
 Faculty of World Studies (~2007)
 Faculty of Entrepreneurship
 Faculty of New Sciences and Technologies (~2010)

In 1992, the faculties of Medicine, Dentistry and Pharmacology seceded to become the Tehran University of Medical Sciences but is still located at the main campus (The central Pardis). The Central Pardis Campus, on Enghelab Ave, is the oldest and best known of the campuses.
Amir Abad Campus is where most of the dormitories are located.
Aside from physical campuses, University of Tehran also has an online campus program first started in 2003 under a project to provide online degree programs, becoming the first university in Iran to host events in regards to the development of formal national ICT.

World rankings

U.S. News & World Report

2018 Best Global Universities

 Engineering: 42

2022 Best Global Universities: #329
 Engineering: 22

Academic Ranking of World Universities

2019: 301-400

2018: 301-400

2017: 301-400

2016: 301-400

2015: 201-300

Times Higher Education
2016–2019: 601–800

U.S. News & World Report

2017 Best Global Universities Ranking

Engineering : 45
Agricultural Sciences : 71
Computer science : 120
Materials Science : 117
Chemistry : 235
Biology, Biochemistry : 307

Libraries and museums
As the largest academic library in Iran, the Central Library and Documentation Center of the University of Tehran includes a rich and broad selection of resources in different fields of science, technology, and literature. The library holdings include over one million books, periodicals, manuscripts, microfilms, pictorial copies, historical documents and photos, lithography books, academic dissertations, scientific documents and maps, over 120,000 books in English, French, German, Russian, Italian, and other languages. Since 1967, the Central Library and Documentation Center has become a member of the International Federation of Library Associations and Institutions (IFLA). The library holds a valuable set of manuscripts, including historical documents, microfilms, pictorial manuscripts, rare books, lithography books, historical photos, and handwriting of scholars and politicians. This collection includes about 17,000 volumes of manuscripts in Persian as well as other languages. The Conservation and Restoration Department of the Library houses the Specialized Lab, the Renovation Workshop, and the Special Bindery office.

Political role

University of Tehran's central place in Iranian elite circles has made it the setting for many political events and cultural works. Perhaps, to historians, the University of Tehran is most notably remembered for its key roles in the political events of recent history. It was in front of the same gates of this school that The Shah's army opened fire on dissident students, killing many and further triggering the 1979 revolution of Iran. It was there and 20 years later in July 1999 that, albeit, a much smaller number of dissident students confronted the police.
University of Tehran (UT) has always been a bastion of political movement and ideology. At UT the leaders of the country deliver some of their most potent speeches often on Friday during prayers. Since the 1979 Islamic Revolution, the main campus of the university and its surrounding streets have been the site for Tehran's Friday prayers.

The political and social role of the University of Tehran in the Iranian domestic arena has continued to be so pronounced that in November 2005 (to February 2008) a senior Islamic scholar became chancellor(president) of the university, replacing Dr. Faraji-dana (professor of electrical engineering faculty). Ayatollah Abbasali Amid Zanjani (عباسعلی عميد زنجانی) is a professor in law, is known for his strong ties to Ayatollah Khomeini in the 1979 revolution, and had spent time in the Shah's prisons before the Islamic Revolution. In February 2008, an Iranian economist, Dr. Farhad Rahbar, a former vice president of Iran and head of Management and Planning Organization of Iran, became the new (31st) chancellor of the university.

One hundred and nineteen faculty members of the University of Tehran are said to have resigned on 15 June 2009 to protest the attack on university dorms in the wake of contested 2009 presidential elections: although clear follow-up data is hard to establish, it seems that most or all resignations were not accepted.

Notable people

Many of the most important figures in Iranian political, academic, and social life have been associated with the University of Tehran.
These Politicians include the nationalist leader Mohammad Mosaddegh, Ayatollah Mohammad Beheshti, former Prime Minister Jamshid Amouzegar, and the recent reformist President Mohammad Khatami.

Academics include Lotfi A. Zadeh the inventor of fuzzy logic, Fields Medal winner Caucher Birkar, Ali Javan who invented the gas laser and is ranked number 12 on the list of the top 100 living geniuses, intellectual and former Prime Minister Mehdi Bazargan and biophysicist Mohammad-Nabi Sarbolouki.

Art figures include renowned filmmakers Abbas Kiarostami and Asghar Farhadi, actor Khosrow Shakibai and poet Mohammad-Taqi Bahar.

Other notable figures include Human Rights Lawyer Shirin Ebadi who won the Nobel Peace Prize in 2003, pioneering architect Heydar Ghiai, prominent philosopher Hossein Nasr, reformist cleric Mehdi Karroubi, environmental activist Mahlagha Mallah.

Alumni from the University of Tehran's predecessor institutions the Dar ul-Funun and the Tehran School of Political Sciences include linguist Ali-Akbar Dehkhoda, Baháʼí scholar Mírzá Abu'l-Fadl and former Prime Ministers Mohammad-Ali Foroughi and Ali Amini.

The School of Engineering at the University of Tehran has introduced many highly recognized researchers all over the world, including:

Babak Hassibi: is an electrical engineer who is the Gordon M. Binder/Amgen Professor of Electrical Engineering and Head of the Department of Electrical Engineering at the California Institute of Technology (Caltech). He received the B.S. degree in electrical engineering from the University of Tehran in 1989, and the M.S. and PhD degrees in electrical engineering from Stanford University in 1993 and 1996, respectively. At Stanford his adviser was Thomas Kailath. He was a Research Associate in the Information Systems Laboratory at Stanford University during 1997-98 and was a Member of the Technical Staff in the Mathematics of Communications Research Group at Bell Laboratories in 1998–2000. Since 2001 he has been at Caltech.

Mohammad Reza Aref: is a politician and academic scholar. He was First Vice President from 2001 to 2005 under Mohammad Khatami. He previously served as Minister of Technology in Khatami's first cabinet. He is currently a member of Supreme Council of the Cultural Revolution and Expediency Discernment Council. He is also an electrical engineer and a professor at University of Tehran and Sharif University of Technology. He was a candidate in the 2013 presidential election but withdrew his candidacy in order to give the reformist camp a better chance to win.

Hamid Jafarkhani: is a Chancellor's Professor in electrical engineering and computer science at the University of California, Irvine's Henry Samueli School of Engineering. His research focuses on communications theory, particularly coding and wireless communications and networks. Prior to studying at the University of Tehran, he was ranked first in the nationwide entrance examination of Iranian universities in 1984.

Kourosh Kalantar-zadeh: is an internationally recognized inventor (for his contributions to the field of ingestible sensors) and a Distinguished Professor at the University of New South Wales.

Nader Engheta: is an Iranian-American scientist. He is currently the H. Nedwill Ramsey Professor at the University of Pennsylvania, Philadelphia, Pennsylvania, USA, affiliated with the departments of Electrical and Systems Engineering, Bioengineering, and Physics and Astronomy.

Kaveh Pahlavan: is a professor of ECE and CS at the Worcester Polytechnic Institute, he is renowned for his pioneering research in Wi-Fi Technology and wireless Indoor-Geolocation. and body area networking. He is the Director of the Center for Wireless Information Network Studies at WPI.

Yahya Rahmat-Samii: is Professor and holder of the Northrop Grumman Chair in Electromagnetics at Electrical Engineering Department at the University of California, Los Angeles, where he teaches and conducts research on microwave transmission and radio antennas. He has made innovations in satellite communications antennas, personal communication antennas, wearable and implanted antennas for communications and biotelemetry, and antennas for remote sensing and radio astronomy applications. He is the Director of the UCLA Antenna Research, Analysis and Measurement Laboratory UCLA Antenna Research, Analysis, and Measurement Laboratory at Department of Electrical Engineering, UCLA.

Alireza Mashaghi: is a physicist and biomedical scientist at Harvard University and Leiden University. He is the founder of parallel education programs in Iran and was the first dual-degree graduate of University of Tehran . Mashaghi is well known for single-molecule analysis of biomolecules, discovery of the mechanism of Von Willebrand disease, the development of circuit topology, and the use of statistical physics for medical diagnostics. He was named the discoverer of the year in 2017. Mashaghi has been affiliated with Harvard University, MIT, ETH Zurich, Delft University of Technology, and Max Planck Institutes. He is an editorial board member of several journals including Nano Research and Scientific Reports. 
 
Alireza Nasiri is a technocrat and businessman who created Iran's first online degree program at University of Tehran in 2003. He is known as the father of commercial forestry in Iran due to empowering the field of greenery with genetically modified trees in Iran.

Lotfi A. Zadeh:is a mathematician, electrical engineer, computer scientist, artificial intelligence researcher and professor emeritus of computer science at the University of California, Berkeley. Zadeh, in his theory of fuzzy sets, proposed using a membership function (with a range covering the interval [0,1]) operating on the domain of all possible values. He proposed new operations for the calculus of logic and showed that fuzzy logic was a generalisation of classical and Boolean logic. He also proposed fuzzy numbers as a special case of fuzzy sets, as well as the corresponding rules for consistent mathematical operations (fuzzy arithmetic). In 1942, he graduated from the University of Tehran with a degree in electrical engineering (Fanni).

He has made significant contributions to the fields of metamaterials, transformation optics, plasmonic optics, nanophotonics, graphene photonics, nano-materials, nanoscale optics, nanoantennas and miniaturized antennas, physics and reverse-engineering of polarization vision in nature, bio-inspired optical imaging, fractional paradigm in electrodynamics, and electromagnetics and microwaves.

Some of the most prominent figures are named below:

Shirin Ebadi:is an Iranian lawyer, a former judge and human rights activist and founder of Defenders of Human Rights Center in Iran. On 10 October 2003, Ebadi was awarded the Nobel Peace Prize for her significant and pioneering efforts for democracy and human rights, especially women's, children's, and refugee rights. She was admitted to the law department of the University of Tehran in 1965 and in 1969, upon graduation, passed the qualification exams to become a judge. After a six-month internship period, she officially became a judge in March 1969. She continued her studies in University of Tehran in the meantime to pursue a master's degree in law in 1971.

Asghar Farhadi:is an Iranian film director and screenwriter. For his work as director, he has received one Golden Globe Award and one Academy Award for Best Foreign Language Film. He was named one of the 100 Most Influential People in the world by Time magazine in 2012. He is a graduate of theatre, with a BA in dramatic arts and MA in stage direction from University of Tehran and Tarbiat Modarres University, respectively.

Siavash Teimouri: is a high ranked Iranian architect and artist. He was born in Tehran, Iran. After getting his master from University of Tehran, faculty of fine arts in 1962, he then moved to Paris and received his PhD in architecture from École nationale supérieure des Beaux-Arts in 1969. While working with top class architects he received the French Association of Architects's prize in 1967. He achieved the first place in design competition for University of Isfahan's faculty of science in 1973. He is a member of the French Society of Architects and also member of the board of trustees of the Iran Architectural Pride Worthies Foundation.

Mohammad Mosaddegh:was the Prime Minister of Iran from 1951 until being overthrown in a coup d'état in 1953. His administration introduced a wide range of social and political reforms but is most notable for its nationalization of the Iranian oil industry, which had been under British control since 1913 through the Anglo-Persian Oil Company (APOC/AIOC) (later British Petroleum or BP). Mosaddegh received his Licence en Droit as well as his Doctor of law from the University of Neuchâtel in Switzerland. Mosaddegh also taught at the University of Tehran at the start of World War I before beginning his long political career.

Ali Javan:is an Iranian American physicist and inventor at MIT. His main contributions to science have been in the fields of quantum physics and spectroscopy. He co-invented the gas laser in 1960, with William R. Bennett. Ali Javan has been ranked Number 12 on the list of the Top 100 living geniuses. He graduated from Alborz High School, started his university studies at University of Tehran and came to the United States in 1948 right after the war.

Mohammad Khatami:is an Iranian scholar, Shiite theologian, and Reformist politician. He served as the fifth President of Iran from 2 August 1997 to 3 August 2005. He also served as Iran's Minister of Culture in both the 1980s and 1990s. He is currently one of the leaders of the Iranian Green Movement, and an outspoken critic of the President Ahmadinejad's government. Khatami is known for his proposal of Dialogue Among Civilizations. The United Nations proclaimed the year 2001 as the United Nations' Year of Dialogue Among Civilizations, on Khatami's suggestion. Khatami received a B.A. in Western philosophy from Isfahan University, but left academia while studying for a master's degree in Educational Sciences at University of Tehran and went to Qom to complete his previous studies in Islamic sciences.

Dr.Seyed Ali Mirlohi Falavarjani, PhD Graduate from the University of Tehran in 1975 and Retired Professor from University of Isfahan, Founder of Islamic Azad University of Falavarjanin 1984.

Mohammad Beheshti: was an Iranian scholar, writer, jurist, and one of the main architects of the constitution of the Islamic Republic in Iran. He was the secretary-general of the Islamic Republic Party, and the head of Iran's judicial system. He was assassinated together with more than seventy members of the Islamic Republic party on 28 June 1981. Beheshti was born in Isfahan and studied both at the University of Tehran and under Allameh Tabatabaei in Qom.

Mehdi Bazargan: was a prominent Iranian scholar, academic, long-time pro-democracy activist, and head of Iran's interim government, making him Iran's first prime minister after the Iranian Revolution of 1979. A well-respected religious intellectual, known for his honesty and expertise in the Islamic and secular sciences, he is credited with being one of the founders of the contemporary intellectual movement in Iran. He was the head of the first engineering department of the University of Tehran.

Bahram Sadeghi: The prominent Iranian writer. He studied medicine at University of Tehran.

Jamshid Amouzegar: is an Iranian economist, artist, and politician who was prime minister from 7 August 1977 to 27 August 1978 when he resigned. He was graduated with degrees in law and engineering from the University of Tehran.

See also

 Academy of Gundishapur
 Nizamiyyah
 Mohammad Moin
 Houchang Nahavandi

References

External links

University of Tehran
Educational institutions established in 1934
Architecture in Iran
1934 establishments in Iran
Members of the International Council for Science
Members of the International Science Council